The Dudley "Red" Garrett Memorial Award is given each year to the player in the American Hockey League determined to be the most outstanding rookie.  The award is based on voting by the media and the players. It was named after Dudley "Red" Garrett, who played in the AHL before fighting and dying in World War II.

Winners

External links
 List of award winners at the Internet Hockey Database
 Bourque wins Red Garrett Award
Official AHL website
AHL Hall of Fame
Historic standings and statistics - at Internet Hockey Database
Dudley Red Garrett Memorial Site - maintained by Dudley's family

American Hockey League trophies and awards